The Nanjing Tongxi Monkey Kings are a Chinese professional basketball team based in Nanjing, Jiangsu, which plays in the Southern Division of the Chinese Basketball Association (CBA). The club joined the league ahead of the 2014–15 CBA season as the Jiangsu Tongxi Monkey Kings, after spending its first seven campaigns at the lower levels of the country's basketball hierarchy. The team was renamed the Nanjing Tongxi Monkey Kings after the 2016–17 CBA season.

Roster

References

External links
 Nanjing Tongxi Monkey Kings official website

Chinese Basketball Association teams
Sport in Nanjing
2007 establishments in China
Basketball teams established in 2007